Tiago David Janeiro Caeiro (born 29 March 1984) is a Portuguese former professional footballer who played as a forward.

Club career

Early years
Born in Vila Franca de Xira, Lisbon District, Caeiro played in the lower leagues until the age of 27. In the 2010–11 season, he scored 11 goals for Atlético Clube de Portugal to help the club return to the Segunda Liga after a lengthy absence (13 across all competitions), then proceeded to net a further six in ten games to kickstart the following campaign.

Belenenses
Caeiro signed for neighbouring C.F. Os Belenenses in the summer of 2012, contributing 13 goals in 30 matches as his team returned to the Primeira Liga after three years. He made his debut in the Portuguese top flight on 21 September 2013, aged 29, playing 60 minutes in a 1–0 home win against C.S. Marítimo.

During a league fixture at Gil Vicente F.C. in April 2014, Caeiro suffered a thigh injury that nearly ended his career, but eventually recovered fully. On 17 May 2015 he scored his first goal of the season, the 1–1 home draw against FC Porto meaning that S.L. Benfica were automatically crowned champions after a goalless tie at Vitória de Guimarães.

Caeiro was used as a substitute during the better part of his spell at the Estádio do Restelo. He scored his only goal in the UEFA Europa League on 20 August 2015, in a 1–0 away victory over SC Rheindorf Altach in the play-off round.

Fátima
On 8 August 2019, the 35-year-old Caeiro joined C.D. Fátima of the Portuguese third division.

Honours
Belenenses
Segunda Liga: 2012–13

References

External links

1984 births
Living people
People from Vila Franca de Xira
Sportspeople from Lisbon District
Portuguese footballers
Association football forwards
Primeira Liga players
Liga Portugal 2 players
Segunda Divisão players
U.D. Vilafranquense players
S.L. Benfica footballers
CD Operário players
Juventude Sport Clube players
Atlético Clube de Portugal players
C.F. Os Belenenses players
C.D. Fátima players